K. Wayne Yang is a professor and scholar in Indigenous organizing and critical pedagogy. He is a professor of ethnic studies at the University of California, San Diego and Provost of John Muir College.

Education and awards 
Wayne Yang graduated with his M.A. in Education from University of California, Berkeley, and received his Ph.D. in Education from University of California, Berkeley. He also holds a B.A. in Physics from Harvard University.

Yang received the Academic Senate Distinguished Teaching Award in 2010.

Professional activities 
Before his academic career, he was a public school teacher in Oakland, California for 15 years. During this time, he co-founded the Avenues Project, a non-profit youth development organization which is inspired by the Survival Programs of the Black Panther Party.

In partnership with Eve Tuck, Yang is the co-founder of the Land Relationship Super Collective. The Land Relationship Super Collective is a grassroots collective of university-based academics that aid decolonization through land reclamation.

Books 
Yang has coedited three books and written one under the avatar la paperson.

Indigenous and Decolonizing Studies in Education: Mapping the Long View 
Indigenous and Decolonizing Studies in Education: Mapping the Long View, edited by Yang along with Linda Tuhiwai Smith and Eve Tuck, is a series of chapters that explore the relationship between decolonization and education. Each chapter is written by a different author, and present educational methods that are rooted in Indigenous principles.

Towards What Justice? Describing Diverse Dreams of Justice in Education 
Towards What Justice? Describing Diverse Dreams of Justice in Education, which Yang coedited with Eve Tuck, features essays by various authors discussing different ideas of justice within colonialism. The book analyzes the ways in which settler colonialism and anti-Blackness permeate the educational system.

Youth Resistance Research and Theories of Change 
Youth Resistance Research and Theories of Change, also coedited by Eve Tuck, explores new ways to understand and engage in youth resistance and challenges traditional conceptions of what “counts” as progress that conventional analyses of youth resistance deploy

A Third University Is Possible 
A Third University Is Possible, written under the avatar la paperson, describes the university as an assemblage and posits the “scyborg” as one who, plugged into a machine such as the university, retools that machinery towards decolonizing purposes.

Selected publications 

 Yang, K. Wayne. (2020) "Sustainability as Plantation Logic, Or, Who Plots an Architecture of Freedom?". www.e-flux.com.
 Yang, K. Wayne Teshome, Tezeru; (2018). "Not Child but MeagerSexualization and Negation of Black Childhood". Small Axe: A Caribbean Journal of Criticism. 22 (3 (57)): 160–170. doi:10.1215/07990537-7249292. ISSN 0799-0537.
 Yang, K. Wayne Yang (2015). Welch, Edwina; Ruanto-Ramirez, Joseph; Magpusao, Nancy (eds.). "Deep Organizing: To Build the beloved community". Nexus: Complicating community & centering the self: 9–21.
 Tuck, Eve; Yang, K. Wayne (2014). "Unbecoming Claims: Pedagogies of Refusal in Qualitative Research". Qualitative Inquiry. 20 (6): 811–818. doi:10.1177/1077800414530265. ISSN 1077-8004.
 Paperson, La (2014). "A ghetto land pedagogy: an antidote for settler environmentalism". Environmental Education Research. 20 (1): 115–130. doi:10.1080/13504622.2013.865115. ISSN 1350-4622.
 Tuck, E., & Yang, K. (2013). R-words: Refusing research. In D. Paris & M. T. Winn (Eds.), Humanizing research: Decolonizing qualitative inquiry with youth and communities. SAGE Publications.
 Eve, Tuck; Yang, K. Wayne (2012). "Decolonization is not a metaphor". Decolonization: Indigeneity, Education & Society. 1(1): 1–40.
 Paperson, La (2010). “The postcolonial ghetto: Seeing her shape and his hand”. Berkeley Review of Education, 1(1).
 Yang, K. Wayne (2009). "Mathematics, critical literacy, and youth participatory action research". New Directions for Youth Development. 2009 (123): 99–118. doi:10.1002/yd.317
 Yang, K Wayne. (2009). Discipline or Punish? Some Suggestions for School Policy and Teacher Practice. Language Arts, 87(1), 49-61.
 Yang, K. Wayne (2007). "Organizing MySpace: Youth walkouts, pleasure, politics and new media". Educational Foundations. vol. 21, no. 1-2: 9–28.

References 

Year of birth missing (living people)
Living people
University of California, San Diego faculty
UC Berkeley Graduate School of Education alumni
Harvard College alumni